The 2022 National League 2, also known as the 2022 MPT Myanmar National League 2, is the 10th season of the MNL-2, the second division league for association football clubs since its founding in 2012.

It has been decided to hold the MNL2 tournament with a total of seven teams. In the league includes the MFF's youth teams and five other clubs. Silver Stars and Mawlamyine City will not be participating in the MNL-2 this season.

Clubs  

It is decided that the MNL-2 will be played with seven teams. The teams include Dagon Star United, Junior Lions, Young Boys, Kachin United, University, Yaw Myay, Mawyawadi and Kachin United. Due to financial issues and budget cuts, University will not be promoted to the 2023 Myanmar National League. Additionally, Junior Lions and Young Boys will also not be promoted regardless of their results, due to them being MFF based clubs. Instead, the four teams that does not have financial restraints or issues will be playing for promotion. The four teams are Dagon Star United, Yaw Myay, Mawyawadi and Kachin United. The top two teams in the end of season standings will be promoted to the 2023 Myanmar National League. No teams will be relegated unless a new MNL-3 has been scheduled, which is not confirmed.

Personnel and sponsoring
Note: Flags indicate national team as has been defined under FIFA eligibility rules. Players may hold more than one non-FIFA nationality.

League table

Top Soccer

|   Phone Chit. 
7Goals

Matches 
Fixtures and Results of the 2022 MNL-2 season.

Week 1

Week 2

Week 3

Week 4

Week 5

Week 6

Week 7

Week 8

Week 9

Week 10

Week 11

Week 12

References

External links
 2022 Myanmar National League

MNL-2 seasons
2022 in Burmese football